This article serves as an index – as complete as possible – of all the honorific orders or similar decorations awarded by North Macedonia, classified by Monarchies chapter and Republics chapter, and, under each chapter, recipients' countries and the detailed list of recipients.

Awards

Republics

United States 
2015 George W. Bush (as Former President of USA ) – Order of the Republic of Macedonia

Hungary 
2013 Viktor Orbán (as Prime Minister of Hungary ) – Order 8-September

Poland 
2013 Bronisław Komorowski (as President of Poland) – Order 8-September

Germany 
2009 Roman Herzog (as Former President of Germany) – Order 8-September

Bulgaria 
2010 Zhelyu Zhelev ( as Former President of Bulgaria)- Order 8-September

Monarchies

Qatar 
2011 Hamad bin Khalifa Al Thani (as Emir of Qatar ) – Order 8-September

Former Monarchies

Austria 
2011 Otto von Habsburg – Order of Merit for Macedonia

North Macedonia-related lists
Heads of state